Taisei Tsurusaki (津留﨑 大成, born October 10, 1997 in Kamagaya, Chiba Prefecture) is a Japanese professional baseball pitcher for the Tohoku Rakuten Golden Eagles in Japan's Nippon Professional Baseball (NBP). He made his NPB debut in 2020.

External links

NPB stats

1997 births
Living people
Japanese baseball players
Nippon Professional Baseball pitchers
Tohoku Rakuten Golden Eagles players
Baseball people from Chiba Prefecture